Tri-Angle is the debut studio album by South Korean boy group TVXQ, released through SM Entertainment on October 13, 2004. Several singles were released as part of the album, including "Hug", "The Way U Are", "I Believe" and the title track "Tri-Angle" featuring BoA and TraxX. 

Commercially, the album peaked at number 1 on the monthly MIAK album chart for October 2004, selling over 166,000 copies. It was the 8th best-selling album during 2004 in South Korea, selling over 242,000 copies by the end of the year. In addition, the physical release of the singles "Hug" and "The Way U Are" collectively sold over 380,000 copies.

Commercial performance 
It sold 242,540 copies and became the eighth most successful album of the year in South Korea. The first single "Hug" debuted with 169,532 physical copies sold in 2004, peaking at number four on the national monthly chart. As of 2014, it sold 242,890 copies. In November 2004, the Japanese version of "Hug" was released in Japan by Rhythm Zone, ultimately selling 4,710 copies.

The second single, "The Way U Are" debuted at number two on the national chart and sold 214,069 copies with its physical release. By the end of the year, the single sold 300,226 copies. The album's last title single "Tri-Angle" uses a sample from the Symphony No. 40 in G minor by Mozart. The single also features the vocals of BoA and rock band the TRAX, however it was not released as a physical single. The album Tri-Angle sold approximately 309,000 copies as of 2011.

Accolades

Track listing

Charts

Weekly charts

Monthly charts

Year-end charts

Release history

References

2004 debut albums
TVXQ albums
SM Entertainment albums
Korean-language albums